Isaac Henry McConnell  was Archdeacon of Cork  from 1945 until 1948.

He was educated at Trinity College, Dublin and ordained in 1901. After curacies in Kinsale and Clonmelhe held incumbencies at Desertserges and Cork. He was Treasurer of Cloyne Cathedral from 1935 to 1942 and then of Cork until his appointment as Archdeacon.

References

Alumni of Trinity College Dublin
Archdeacons of Cork